The Command Support Regiment is a regiment of the Royal Danish Army. It was established in 1951 with the purpose of training and equipping units to support the Danish army with wartime Command, Control and Communications. Until 1 January 2019 the unit was known as Signal Regiment ). Today the battalions filled by the regiment set up the command, control and communications infrastructure of the army by setting up a vehicle-based microwave radio relay network in a mesh topology. The network is designed to be secure, encrypted and difficult to neutralize. Besides the radio network, the regiment also establishes mobile military headquarters to be used by the army.

History
The history of the signal regiment dates back to 1867, when the first Danish signal unit was formed; the 4th Engineering Coy. On January 1, 1914 the company gained status of a battalion in the Engineering Regiment. On November 1, 1947 the Ministry of Defence decided to move the signal battalion from the engineering regiment to serving directly under the Generalkommandoen. The result was the world's first independent signal unit. The signal battalion was later split into two battalions. On November 1, 1951 the two battalions were given regimental status and named Zealandic Signal Regiment and Jutlandic Signal Regiment.

The Zealandic Signal Regiment was attached to LANDZEALAND with 1st TGBTN(BALTAP) and 4th TGBTN(COMLANDZEALAND) and EW Coy/east. The Jutlandic Signal Regiment was attached to LANDJUT with 2nd TGBTN(BALTAP), 5th TGBTN(COMLANDJUT) and 3rd TGBTN(JDIV) and EW Coy/west.

In 1989, as the Cold War drew to a close, Parliament decided to merge the two regiments, garrisoning the resulting unit in Fredericia. This decision was effected on January 1, 1992 and the new regiment was named Signal Regiment.

Structure
The regiment is composed of four battalions:
  1st Command Support Battalion, Command Support Regiment (1. FOSTBTN), in Fredericia
  Brigade Staff Company
  Brigade CIS Company (Communications & Information Systems Company)
  2nd Command Support Battalion, Command Support Regiment (2. FOSTBTN)
  1st DCM-E Company (Danish Deployable Communications & Information Systems Module, Echo Company)
  2nd CIS Company (Communications & Information Systems Company)
  3rd Basic Training Company
  3rd CIS Operations Support Battalion (3. CISOPSBTN)
  Implementation
  Frequency Section
  Joint Communication
  CIS Operations Centre
  Federated Mission Networking
  Training 
  Command Support Battalion, in Ādaži
  Multinational Staff, in Ādaži
  Command Support Company (Royal Danish Army), in Karup 
  Force Protection Company (Estonian Army)
  Real Life Support Company (Latvian Army), in Ādaži
  Garrison Support Unit 

Disband units:
  The Army Command & Control Support School (Hærens Føringsstøtte Skole)(now part of 3rd Battalion)

Garrison
The regiment is garrisoned in the towns of Fredericia and Haderslev. In Fredericia, the regiment has Ryes Kaserne. 
Haderslev Kaserne is home to a company from the regiment.

Besides the two bases, the regiment operates Hyby Fælled Proving Ground outside Fredericia. The proving ground is open for the public.

Names of the regiment

See also
Signals (military)
C4ISTAR

References

  

Danish Army regiments
Military units and formations established in 1951
1951 establishments in Denmark